The Asansol Engineering College or AEC is a private engineering college in Asansol, West Bengal, India. It offers different undergraduate and postgraduate courses in Engineering and Technology and other allied fields. It was established in 1998 by The Academy of Engineers as a joint venture between the JIS group and the Techno India group.

About College
The college is affiliated with Maulana Abul Kalam Azad University of Technology and all the relevant programmes are approved by the All India Council for Technical Education. The college has a grant from the World Bank under Technical Education Quality Improvement Programme(TEQIP).

The campus is located along Vivekananda Sarani at Kanyapur, Asansol.

Academics
The institute offers ten undergraduate courses:-
 B.Tech. in Electronics and Communication Engineering (ECE)- 4 years [Approved intake - 120]
 B.Tech. in Applied Electronics and Instrumentation (AEIE)- 4 years [Approved intake - 30]
 B.Tech. in Electrical Engineering (EE)- 4 years [Approved intake - 60]
 B.Tech. in Mechanical Engineering (ME)- 4 years [Approved intake - 120]
 B.Tech. in Computer Science and Engineering (CSE)- 4 years [Approved intake - 180]
 B.Tech. in Civil Engineering (CE)- 4 years [Approved intake - 30]
 B.Tech. in Information Technology (IT)- 4 years [Approved intake - 120]
 B.Tech. in Computer Science and Business Systems (CSBS)- 4 years [Approved intake - 60]
 B.Tech. in Artificial Intelligence and Machine Learning (AIML)- 4 years [Approved intake - 60]
 B.Tech. in CSE (Internet of Things & Cyber Security Including BlockChain Technology) (CSE(IOT)- 4 years [Approved intake - 60]
 BCA- 3 years [Approved intake - 120]
 BBA- 3 years [Approved intake - 120]
 BBA (Insurance & Risk Management)- 3 years [Approved intake - 60]
 BHM (Bachelor of Hospital Management)- 3 years [Approved intake - 60]
 B.Sc. Data Science- 3 years [Approved intake - 60]

The institute also offers three post-graduate courses:-
 M.Tech. in Electrical Engineering (EE)- 2 years [Approved intake - 13]
 M.Tech. in Electronics and Communication Engineering (ECE)- 2 years [Approved intake - 13]
 Master in Computer Applications M.C.A - 2 years [Approved intake - 60]

See also

References

External links 
 Asansol Engineering College website

Engineering colleges in West Bengal
Universities and colleges in Paschim Bardhaman district
Education in Asansol
Colleges affiliated to West Bengal University of Technology
Educational institutions established in 1998
1998 establishments in West Bengal